Heather McEwen (born 4 February 1984) is a Canadian actress. She began acting professionally at the age of 12, and in 2002 was nominated for a Leo Award as Best Supporting Performance in a Feature-Length Drama for Voyage of the Unicorn.

She studied Classical Drama and English Literature at The University of Toronto, Ontario, Canada, and at Manchester University in the United Kingdom. She is a registered yoga teacher with Yoga Alliance International.

Awards and nominations

References

External links

1984 births
Actresses from Vancouver
Canadian film actresses
Canadian television actresses
Living people